Seo-dong Station is an underground station of the Busan Metro Line 4 in Seo-dong, Geumjeong District, Busan, South Korea.

Station Layout

Vicinity
 Exit 1: Hyundai Oilbank
 Exit 2:
 Exit 3: Kia Auto Q Service
 Exit 4:

External links
  Cyber station information from Busan Transportation Corporation

Busan Metro stations
Geumjeong District
Railway stations opened in 2011